Celia Martin Chazelle (born April 7, 1954) is a Canadian-American historian and author. She is a professor of history at The College of New Jersey.

Early life and education 
Celia Martin was born in California on April 7, 1954, to an English father, John Martin, who held small roles in films and who taught English literature at the University of Calgary. Her mother Constance was born in Calgary. Her grandfather was a manager of Paramount Pictures in London during the era of silent films. Chazelle completed a Bachelor of Arts in history at the University of Toronto in 1977. She earned a Master of Arts in medieval studies in 1978 at Yale University, where she also completed a doctorate of philosophy in 1985. Chazelle has two younger siblings.

Career 
In 2008, Chazelle began teaching courses in social justice and prison history at the Albert C. Wagner Youth Correctional Facility, through the Petey Greene Prisoner Assistance Program. She later taught joint courses with The College of New Jersey (TCNJ). She is a professor of history at TCNJ and was the department chair there from 2008 to 2014. In 2019, Brill Academic Publishing published her latest monograph, The Codex Amiatinus and Its Sister Bibles: Scripture, Liturgy, and Art in the Milieu of the Venerable Bede. She was also named a Fellow of the Medieval Academy of America in 2019.

Personal life 
Chazelle is married to French computer scientist Bernard Chazelle. They have two children, Damien and Anna.

Selected works

Books

References

External links
 

1954 births
Living people
20th-century Canadian historians
21st-century Canadian historians
Canadian women historians
20th-century Canadian women writers
21st-century Canadian women writers
University of Toronto alumni
Yale Graduate School of Arts and Sciences alumni
The College of New Jersey faculty
Canadian people of English descent
Canadian expatriate academics in the United States
Fellows of the Medieval Academy of America